STS-61-H was a NASA Space Shuttle mission planned to launch on 24 June 1986 using Columbia. However, it was canceled after the Challenger disaster.

Crew

Backup crew

Crew notes 
Before Buchli was assigned to STS-61-H, Norman E. Thagard was the potential Mission Specialist 3 for this flight.

Mission objectives 
The main task of the mission was to bring two commercial satellites into orbit – Palapa B3 and Westar-6S, and military communication satellite - Skynet-4A, The British Skynet and the Indonesian Palapa were supposed to be accompanied by an astronaut from the two countries.

After the Challenger disaster, the deployment of commercial satellites by the Space Shuttle was stopped, and for several years no international astronauts were nominated. Thus, neither the British nor the Indonesian payload specialists got a second chance for a spaceflight. The NASA crew however stayed together and participated in a 56-hour-long simulated mission known as STS-61-M(T) in 1987. The crew finally flew on STS-29, with Anna L. Fisher being replaced by James P. Bagian.

Skynet 4A was launched on 1 January 1990 with a Titan III, Westar-6S was renamed Galaxy-6 and launched on 12 October 1992 by an Ariane 44L. Palapa-B3 was renamed to Palapa B2P and was launched on 20 March 1987 with a Delta-3920.

See also 
 Cancelled Space Shuttle missions
 STS-29

References

External links 
 http://www.mach25.nl/~jacques/shuttle/STS61H.html

Cancelled Space Shuttle missions